Leon Heywood (26 May 1952 – 2014) was an Australian professional snooker player.

Career 
Heywood grew up in Adelaide, and was runner-up to Ron Atkins in the Australian National Snooker Championships in 1976. Both players represented Australia at the 1976 IBSF World Snooker Championship, where Heywood won only one of his seven group matches.

In a 1979 match against Graham Miles, Heywood became the first Australian amateur player to make a maximum break.

Heywood was accepted as a professional by the World Professional Billiards and Snooker Association (WPBSA) in 1983. He played ten matches as a professional, but did not win any of them. His first match was a 7–10 defeat by George Scott in the first qualifying round of the 1984 World Snooker Championship, and his last match ended in a 4–6 defeat by Ian Anderson at the 1987 Australian Professional Championship. The highest ranking that he achieved was 80th. Heywood died in 2014.

References

1952 births
2014 deaths
Australian snooker players